Tarek Omar Abdul Fattah Aggad  (born 1971) is a Saudi businessman. He is the executive director of the Aggad Investment Company (AICO) and chairman of Arab Palestinian Investment Company, two firms founded by his father, Omar Aggad.

Biography 
Aggad was born in Lebanon in 1971, the son of Omar Aggad, and grew up in Riyadh, Saudi Arabia where he attended local schools. He holds a bachelor's degree in Economics from Harvard University, US. He is married to Shirine Aggad, and they have four children.

Aggad serves as a director on a number of boards including Aggad Investment Company, Palestine Power Generation Company, Palestine Electric Company, Bank of Palestine, King Hussein Cancer Foundation, King’s Academy  as well as  other companies in Palestine, Jordan, and Saudi Arabia.

In 2019 Tarek Aggad was decorated with the “Star of Merit” of the “Order of Palestine” by President Mahmoud Abbas of Palestine in recognition of his distinguished national efforts, particularly in promoting the Palestinian economy and as an appreciation for his generous contributions in serving his people and Country.

Personal life
He is married to Shirine Aggad, and they have four children.

References

20th-century Saudi Arabian businesspeople
21st-century Saudi Arabian businesspeople
1971 births
Harvard College alumni
Living people
Palestinian businesspeople
Saudi Arabian chief executives